The M70 motorway is a motorway in Hungary, connecting the M7 motorway to the A5 motorway in Slovenia. The road is 21 km long and has a speed limit of 130 km/h. The last section was completed in 2006. After the opening of the last missing sections of the M7 on August 19, 2008, there is a direct motorway link from Budapest to Slovenia. The expressway originally consisted of two lanes between Letenye and Tornyiszentmiklós interchanges. As a four-lane, full profile motorway, it opened on December 13, 2019 (see the Hungarian article for references in Hungarian). It was built by the Colas Group.

Opening timeline
Letenye; M7 – Tornyiszentmiklós (18.6 km): November 2004 - half profile; December 13, 2019 - full profile
Tornyiszentmiklós – ( border) (2 km): 2005

Junctions, exits and rest area

Maintenance
The operation and maintenance of the road by Hungarian Public Road Nonprofit Pte Ltd Co. This activity is provided by this highway engineer.
 near Eszteregnye (M7), kilometre trench 219

Payment
Since February 1, 2015, the M70 is fully tolled. It can be paid with the national sticker or county sticker of following counties:

European route(s)

Significant structures
 Bridge
 Korongi Bridge over the M7 motorway

See also 

 Roads in Hungary
 Transport in Hungary
 International E-road network

References

External links 

National Toll Payment Services Plc. (in Hungarian, some information also in English)
 Hungarian Public Road Non-Profit Ltd. (Magyar Közút Nonprofit Zrt.)
 National Infrastructure Developer Ltd.

70